Phase Five of the Marvel Cinematic Universe (MCU) is a group of American superhero films and television series produced by Marvel Studios based on characters that appear in publications by Marvel Comics. Phase Five features all of the Marvel Studios productions set to be released starting from 2023 to mid-2024, with Walt Disney Studios Motion Pictures distributing the films, while the series release on Disney+. Animation in the phase was produced by Marvel Studios Animation. The first film in the phase is Ant-Man and the Wasp: Quantumania, released in February 2023, with the first series in the phase being Secret Invasion, set for release in early 2023. Kevin Feige produces every film and serves as executive producer of every series in this phase, alongside producers Stephen Broussard for Ant-Man and the Wasp: Quantumania, Nate Moore for Captain America: New World Order, and Eric Carroll for Blade.

The films of the phase include Ant-Man and the Wasp: Quantumania starring Paul Rudd and Evangeline Lilly, the ensemble Guardians of the Galaxy Vol. 3, The Marvels starring Brie Larson, Teyonah Parris, and Iman Vellani, Captain America: New World Order starring Anthony Mackie, the ensemble Thunderbolts, and Blade starring Mahershala Ali.

The Disney+ television series of the phase include Secret Invasion starring Samuel L. Jackson and Ben Mendelsohn, the second season of Loki starring Tom Hiddleston, the second season of the animated What If...? narrated by Jeffrey Wright, Ironheart starring Dominique Thorne, Echo starring Alaqua Cox, Agatha: Coven of Chaos starring Kathryn Hahn, and Daredevil: Born Again starring Charlie Cox. Phase Five, along with Phase Four and Phase Six, constitutes The Multiverse Saga.

Development 
By April 2014, Marvel Studios President Kevin Feige said that additional storylines for the Marvel Cinematic Universe (MCU) were planned through 2028. During Marvel Studios' panel at the July 2019 San Diego Comic-Con, Feige announced several films and Disney+ television series in development for Phase Four of the MCU, before revealing the film Blade was also in development. After the panel, Feige confirmed that Blade was not part of the Phase Four slate at the time, and that what was announced was the full Phase Four slate at that point, despite Marvel already developing further projects at that time, such as the long-in-development Guardians of the Galaxy Vol. 3, and a sequel to Captain Marvel (2019). An Ant-Man and the Wasp (2018) sequel entered development by November 2019, having a potential 2022 release. Development work on a second season of What If...? had begun by December 2019.

In April 2020, Disney scheduled Captain Marvel 2 for release on July 8, 2022, before moving it back to November 11, 2022, in December 2020. Also in December, they dated Guardians of the Galaxy Vol. 3 for 2023, and announced Ant-Man and the Wasp: Quantumania and Fantastic Four were in development, along with the Disney+ series Secret Invasion, Ironheart, and Armor Wars (later changed to a film). Feige indicated Secret Invasion and Ironheart would tie-in with future MCU films. These Disney+ series, plus Captain Marvel 2, Ant-Man and the Wasp: Quantumania, Guardians of the Galaxy Vol. 3, and Fantastic Four were believed to be a part of Phase Four at that time. By November 2020, development had begun on a second season of the television series Loki, which was formally confirmed in July 2021. Development on a series centered on Echo as a spin-off from Hawkeye began by March 2021. By the end of April 2021, a fourth Captain America film was revealed to be in development as a continuation of the series The Falcon and the Winter Soldier (2021). In May 2021, Marvel Studios announced the title for Captain Marvel 2 as The Marvels, as well as the respective February 17 and May 5, 2023, release dates for Ant-Man and the Wasp: Quantumania and Guardians of the Galaxy Vol. 3. In October 2021, Marvel Studios further adjusted The Marvels to February 17, 2023, and Ant-Man and the Wasp: Quantumania to July 28, 2023, only to swap their release dates in April 2022, given Quantumania was further along in production than The Marvels. Development on a series centered on Agatha Harkness as a spin-off from WandaVision began by October 2021. During the Disney+ Day event the following month, Marvel Studios officially announced Echo and Agatha: Coven of Chaos.

By March 2022, a reboot project of Marvel Television's Netflix series Daredevil (2015–2018) was revealed to be in development, and was confirmed to be in development for Disney+ in May. By June 2022, Marvel Studios was developing the film Thunderbolts. Later that month, Feige said information on the next saga of the MCU would be provided in the following months, with Marvel Studios being a "little more direct" on their future plans to provide audiences with "the bigger picture [so they] can see a tiny, tiny bit more of the roadmap" following the clues included during Phase Four. At Marvel Studios' San Diego Comic-Con panel in July 2022, Feige announced that Black Panther: Wakanda Forever would conclude Phase Four, with the following films and series becoming part of Phase Five: Ant-Man and the Wasp: Quantumania, Guardians of the Galaxy Vol. 3, The Marvels, Secret Invasion, and Ironheart. Blade, the second season of Loki, Echo, and Agatha: Coven of Chaos were also confirmed for Phase Five, with Feige announcing the series Daredevil: Born Again and the films Captain America: New World Order and Thunderbolts. He also announced that Phase Five, along with Phase Four and Phase Six, would be part of The Multiverse Saga. By then, the second season of What If...? was also announced to release during this phase. Feige stated that many of the projects in Phase Four and Five, and their post-credit teases, would connect and lead towards the conclusion of The Multiverse Saga, while some would remain standalone. Feige described Quantumania as "a direct line" into the phase and Phase Six's Avengers: The Kang Dynasty (2025). In October, Blade had its release date pushed back to September 6, 2024, due to production-related issues. In December 2022, Echo head writer Marion Dayre stated that the series would be delayed to late 2023, around that December.

In early February 2023, Disney CEO Bob Iger announced that the company would be re-evaluating the volume of content it output as a way to cut costs over the next few years. Shortly after, when reflecting on the amount of Disney+ content released for Phase Four in a short time frame, Feige anticipated that Marvel Studios would look to space out the releases of the Phase Five and Six Disney+ series or put fewer out each year "so they can each get a chance to shine". At that time, the second season of Loki and Secret Invasion were still expected to release in 2023, while other projects in post-production, such as Echo and Ironheart, were unlikely to release that year as previously announced. The Marvels was also delayed to November 10, 2023. A month later, Iger said there was "nothing in any way inherently off in terms of the Marvel brand", and was not concerned with the volume of Marvel content being released. Rather, he believed there would be more of a benefit to not "go[ing] back to the well on certain characters" and produce third or fourth sequel projects with those, instead shifting to other characters and stories.

Films

Ant-Man and the Wasp: Quantumania (2023) 

Scott Lang and Hope van Dyne, along with Hope's parents Hank Pym and Janet van Dyne and Lang's daughter Cassie, go on a new adventure exploring the Quantum Realm that pushes their limits and pits them against Kang the Conqueror.

Ahead of the release of Ant-Man and the Wasp (2018), Peyton Reed and Marvel Studios expected a third Ant-Man film would be made and had discussed potential story points, with Reed returning as director by November 2019, alongside Paul Rudd and Evangeline Lilly as Scott Lang / Ant-Man and Hope van Dyne / Wasp. Jeff Loveness was writing the script by April 2020, with the title and new cast members revealed that December. Principal photography began at the end of July 2021 at Pinewood Studios in Buckinghamshire, and ended that November. Shooting was also scheduled to occur in Atlanta, Georgia and San Francisco, to last until 2022. Ant-Man and the Wasp: Quantumania premiered on February 6, 2023, and was released on February 17.

Ant-Man and the Wasp: Quantumania is set in 2025, around the same time as the events of Black Panther: Wakanda Forever (2022) and the beginning of Ms. Marvel (2022). Jonathan Majors portrays Kang the Conqueror, after first appearing as a variant of that character called He Who Remains in the first season of Loki (2021). Majors also portrays numerous Kang variants within the Council of Kangs including Immortus, Rama-Tut, and Centurion in the film's mid-credits scene, and Victor Timely in the post-credits scene. The latter also features uncredited cameo appearances by Tom Hiddleston and Owen Wilson, reprising their respective roles of Loki and Mobius M. Mobius from Loki.

Guardians of the Galaxy Vol. 3 (2023) 

The Guardians of the Galaxy are adjusting to life on Knowhere, but when parts of Rocket's past resurface, Peter Quill must lead the Guardians on a dangerous mission to protect him that could lead to the team dissolving.

A third Guardians of the Galaxy film was planned by Marvel Studios in April 2016, with James Gunn returning to write and direct a year later. Disney fired him in July 2018 after the resurfacing of controversial tweets, but reversed course that October and reinstated Gunn as director. Gunn's return was revealed in early 2019 along with the five main stars' involvement, with production beginning after Gunn completed his film The Suicide Squad (2021) and its spin-off series Peacemaker (2022). Kevin Feige confirmed the film was in development at the July 2019 San Diego Comic-Con. Filming began in November 2021, at Trilith Studios in Atlanta, and concluded in early May 2022. Guardians of the Galaxy Vol. 3 is scheduled to be released on May 5, 2023.

Guardians of the Galaxy Vol. 3 is set after the events of The Guardians of the Galaxy Holiday Special (2022).

The Marvels (2023) 

Carol Danvers, Kamala Khan, and Monica Rambeau begin swapping places with each other every time they use their powers and must team up to figure out why.

Feige confirmed a sequel to Captain Marvel (2019) was in development at the July 2019 San Diego Comic-Con, with Megan McDonnell set to write the script and Brie Larson returning as Carol Danvers / Captain Marvel by January 2020. The studio wanted a female director for the film rather than have Anna Boden and Ryan Fleck return from the first, with Nia DaCosta hired to direct by that August, and she also served as a writer alongside Elissa Karasik and Zeb Wells. The film was announced with the title Captain Marvel 2 in December 2020, with the official title, The Marvels, revealed in May 2021. Second unit filming began in mid-April 2021 in New Jersey, while principal photography had begun by August at Pinewood Studios in Buckinghamshire, Longcross Studios in Surrey, and in Tropea. Shooting also occurred in Los Angeles. Filming wrapped by May 2022. The Marvels is scheduled to be released on November 10, 2023.

The Marvels is set after the events of the Disney+ series Ms. Marvel, and continues the story from Captain Marvel. with Iman Vellani, Saagar Shaikh, Zenobia Shroff, and Mohan Kapur reprising their respective roles as Kamala Khan / Ms. Marvel, Aamir Khan, Muneeba Khan, and Yusuf Khan. Teyonah Parris returns as the adult Monica Rambeau from the series WandaVision (2021), after the character was previously portrayed as a child by Akira Akbar in Captain Marvel.

Captain America: New World Order (2024) 

In April 2021, a fourth Captain America film was revealed to be in development, with a script co-written by Malcolm Spellman and Dalan Musson. The duo previously served as head writer and a staff writer, respectively, on the Disney+ series The Falcon and the Winter Soldier (2021). Anthony Mackie joined by August the same year, to headline the film reprising his role as Sam Wilson / Captain America. Julius Onah was chosen to direct in July 2022. The film will explore the effects of becoming Captain America on Wilson. Filming was scheduled to begin in March 2023, at Trilith Studios in Atlanta, to last until that June. Captain America: New World Order is scheduled to be released on May 3, 2024.

Danny Ramirez and Carl Lumbly reprise their respective roles of Joaquin Torres / Falcon and Isaiah Bradley from The Falcon and the Winter Soldier, alongside Tim Blake Nelson as Samuel Sterns / Leader from The Incredible Hulk (2008). Harrison Ford portrays Thaddeus "Thunderbolt" Ross, replacing the late William Hurt from previous MCU films.

Thunderbolts (2024) 

A group of antiheroes goes on missions for the government.

By June 2022, a Thunderbolts film was in development, with Jake Schreier attached to direct, and Eric Pearson writing the screenplay. In September, the Thunderbolts team was announced to include Sebastian Stan as Bucky Barnes / Winter Soldier / White Wolf, Hannah John-Kamen as Ava Starr / Ghost, Wyatt Russell as John Walker / U.S. Agent, Julia Louis-Dreyfus as Valentina Allegra de Fontaine, Florence Pugh as Yelena Belova / Black Widow, David Harbour as Alexei Shostakov / Red Guardian, and Olga Kurylenko as Antonia Dreykov / Taskmaster, all reprising their roles from previous MCU projects. Filming is scheduled to begin in June 2023, in Atlanta. Thunderbolts is scheduled to be released on July 26, 2024.

Harrison Ford will reprise his role as Thaddeus "Thunderbolt" Ross from Captain America: New World Order.

Blade (2024) 

By May 2013, Marvel Studios had a working script for a new Blade film after regaining the rights following New Line Cinema's prior film series. In February 2019, Mahershala Ali approached Marvel Studios about starring in a new film after previously portraying Cornell "Cottonmouth" Stokes in Marvel Television's Luke Cage. Feige officially announced the film with Ali in the title role that July at San Diego Comic-Con; Ali first had an uncredited voice cameo as Blade in Eternals (2021). In February 2021, Stacy Osei-Kuffour was hired to write the film, with Bassam Tariq hired to direct by that September. Tariq left a year later due to the film's production shifts, and creative differences. Yann Demange was set to direct in November, when Michael Starrbury was rewriting the script. Filming is scheduled to begin in May 2023, at Tyler Perry Studios in Atlanta, and will also occur in Cleveland, New Orleans, and Morocco. Blade is scheduled to be released on September 6, 2024.

The Ebony Blade will be featured in the film, having first appeared at the end of Eternals.

Television series 

All the series in Phase Five are being released on Disney+.

Secret Invasion 

A faction of Skrulls have infiltrated all aspects of life on Earth.

By September 2020, Marvel Studios was developing a series centered on Nick Fury, with Samuel L. Jackson reprising his role and Kyle Bradstreet serving as head writer. That December, Marvel Studios revealed the series to be an adaptation of the Secret Invasion comic book storyline, and confirmed Jackson, with Ben Mendelsohn co-starring as Talos. Filming had begun by September 2021 in London, with Thomas Bezucha and Ali Selim directing episodes of the series. Filming concluded in late April 2022. Additional filming occurred across West Yorkshire and in Liverpool, England. Secret Invasion is scheduled to be released in early 2023, and will consist of six episodes.

Secret Invasion is set after the events of Spider-Man: Far From Home (2019), and is a follow-up to the story of Captain Marvel. Cobie Smulders, Martin Freeman, and Don Cheadle will reprise their respective MCU roles of Maria Hill, Everett K. Ross, and James "Rhodey" Rhodes.

Loki season 2 

The first season of Loki premiered in June 2021. Development on a second season had begun by November 2020, with season one head writer Michael Waldron expected to once again be involved "in some capacity" by January 2021. The season was officially confirmed in July 2021, along with Tom Hiddleston returning to star as Loki. By February 2022, Eric Martin was set to write the season, with Waldron as an executive producer. Filming began in mid-June 2022, at Pinewood Studios in the United Kingdom, with Justin Benson and Aaron Moorhead directing the majority of episodes, and concluded that October. The second season of Loki is scheduled to be released in mid-2023, and will consist of six episodes.

Jonathan Majors will reprise his role as Victor Timely from Ant-Man and the Wasp: Quantumania.

What If...? season 2 

Following the formation of the Guardians of the Multiverse, the Watcher continues to meet new heroes and strange worlds in the Marvel Cinematic Universe multiverse.

The first season of What If...? premiered in August 2021. In December 2019, Marvel Studios Animation had begun work on the second season. A. C. Bradley and Bryan Andrews return as head writer and director, respectively. The season was announced to debut in early 2023, though by February 2023, it was reportedly unlikely to release in 2023 as previously announced. It will consist of nine episodes.

Ironheart 

In December 2020, Marvel Studios announced a series centered on Riri Williams / Ironheart was in development starring Dominique Thorne, reprising her role from the film Black Panther: Wakanda Forever. Chinaka Hodge was hired as head writer in April 2021. Ryan Coogler, writer and director of Black Panther (2018) and Black Panther: Wakanda Forever, co-develops the series through his company Proximity Media, as does 20th Television. Filming had begun by early June 2022, at Trilith Studios in Atlanta, with Sam Bailey and Angela Barnes directing episodes of the series. Filming also occurred in Chicago by late October, and concluded in early November. Ironheart was announced to be released in late 2023, though by February 2023, it was reportedly unlikely to release in 2023 as previously announced. It will consist of six episodes.

Ironheart is set after the events of Black Panther: Wakanda Forever.

Echo 

Maya Lopez returns to her hometown after the events in New York City, where she must come to terms with her past, while reconnecting with her Native American roots, and embrace her family and community.

Development on a spin-off from the series Hawkeye (2021) starring Alaqua Cox as Maya Lopez / Echo began by March 2021, with Etan Cohen and Emily Cohen set to write and executive produce. Echo was officially announced that November, when Marion Dayre was revealed to be serving as head writer. 20th Television co-produces the series. Filming began in late April 2022, and concluded in late August, occurring throughout the Atlanta metropolitan area in Atlanta, Peachtree City, Social Circle, and Grantville, Georgia, with Sydney Freeland and Catriona McKenzie directing episodes of the series. Echo is expected to be released in late 2023, around that December, though by February 2023, it was reportedly unlikely to release in 2023 as previously announced.

Echo is set after the events of Hawkeye and leads into the events of Daredevil: Born Again. Zahn McClarnon reprises his role as William Lopez from Hawkeye, along with Vincent D'Onofrio as Wilson Fisk / Kingpin and Charlie Cox as Matt Murdock / Daredevil from previous MCU media.

Agatha: Coven of Chaos 

Development on a spin-off from the series WandaVision starring Kathryn Hahn as Agatha Harkness began by October 2021, with Jac Schaeffer set to write and executive produce. The series was initially announced in November 2021 as Agatha: House of Harkness, until it was retitled in July 2022. 20th Television co-produces the series. Filming began in mid-January 2023, at Trilith Studios in Atlanta, with Schaeffer, Gandja Monteiro, and Rachel Goldberg directing episodes of the series. Filming is expected to last until late April 2023. Agatha: Coven of Chaos is scheduled to be released in late 2023, and will consist of nine episodes.

Several actors reprise their WandaVision roles, including Emma Caulfield Ford as Sarah Proctor, Debra Jo Rupp as Sharon Davis, David Payton as John Collins, David Lengel as Harold Proctor, Asif Ali as Abilash Tandon, Amos Glick as "Dennis", Brian Brightman as a sheriff, and Kate Forbes as Evanora Harkness.

Daredevil: Born Again 

In March 2022, a new Daredevil project was revealed to be in development with Feige as a producer, after Disney regained the rights to the Marvel Television series Daredevil (2015–2018) from Netflix and it began streaming on Disney+. The series was confirmed to be in development for Disney+ in May, with Matt Corman and Chris Ord attached as head writers and executive producers, and was officially announced in July with Charlie Cox returning as Matt Murdock / Daredevil. 20th Television co-produces the series. Filming began in early March 2023, in New York to last until mid-November, with Michael Cuesta directing the first episode. Daredevil: Born Again is scheduled to be released in early 2024, and will consist of 18 episodes.

Daredevil: Born Again is set after the events of Echo. Vincent D'Onofrio will reprise his role as Wilson Fisk / Kingpin from previous MCU media, along with Jon Bernthal as Frank Castle / Punisher from Daredevil and The Punisher (2017–2019).

Timeline 

Ant-Man and the Wasp: Quantumania is set in 2025, around the same time as the events of Black Panther: Wakanda Forever and the beginning of Ms. Marvel. Secret Invasion is set after the events of Spider-Man: Far From Home. The Marvels is set after the events of Ms. Marvel. Guardians of the Galaxy Vol. 3 is set after the events of The Guardians of the Galaxy Holiday Special. Echo is set after the events of Hawkeye. Ironheart is set after the events of Black Panther: Wakanda Forever. Daredevil: Born Again is set after the events of Echo.

Recurring cast and characters

Music

Soundtracks

Reception

Box office performance

Critical and public response

Tie-in media

Marvel Studios: Legends season 2 (2023–present) 

Announced in December 2020, this series examines individual heroes, villains, moments, and objects from the Marvel Cinematic Universe and how they connect, in anticipation of the upcoming stories that will feature them in Phase Five, after initially being announced for appearances in Phase Four. The first Marvel Studios: Legends episodes for the phase were released on February 10, 2023. Episodes highlighted Ant-Man, Hank Pym and Janet van Dyne, and the Wasp.

Notes

References 

 
2023 beginnings
Phase 5